Polphail was a ghost village in Scotland. It was demolished in 2016.

Location
Polphail was located at Portavadie on the west coast of the Cowal Peninsula, in Argyll & Bute.

Description
Polphail village was never occupied. It was a ruin from the outset. In July 2009 Agents of Change, an artistic collective, came to Pollphail knowing that the site was due for demolition later that year. They created a graffiti art gallery with paintings of figures, faces, abstract designs and haunting images. The village was finally demolished by December 2016, at a cost of £300,000, with a planning application submitted for a craft distillery on the site.

The origins  of the 1970s village lie during the expansion of the oil industry in the 1970s. Specific locations around the coast of Scotland were developed for the construction sites to build oil rig platforms. Portavadie and Polphail on the west coast of the Cowal peninsula, on Loch Fyne, was chosen as one such location. It provided a sheltered port, a geological feature in which to build a dry dock and a construction yard for the building of deep water oil gravity platforms. Land was purchased for the whole development by the Government for the construction yard and adjacent village that was built between 1975 and 1977, to house up to 500 workers. The impetus to build the yard was based on future forecasting and was to be operated by the people living in Polphail village, but structural design issues of the oil gravity platforms, cost implications and inflexibility in the sector at the time led to no orders being placed at the yard.

History
The farms of Portavadie and Polphail are depicted amongst areas of cultivated ground on the Ordnance Survey 1st edition map. Portavadie continued into the 1970s as a small rural settlement comprising half a dozen houses, however, Polphail farm appears to have been abandoned and is not depicted on the Ordnance Survey ‘Popular’ edition map in 1926 (Sheet 71). The position of the new village was placed just north of Polphail farm. Today, Portavadie comprises eight individual houses; a row of detached holiday houses, built as part of the marina development, the ferry terminal across Loch Fyne to Tarbert and the empty village of Polphail.

References

External links
 Film by Agents of Change of their work at Pollphail in 2009

Ghost towns in Scotland
Villages in Argyll and Bute
Cowal